Úna Ní Dhonghaíle is an Irish film editor, who has worked on cinema and television projects.

Career 
She won a BAFTA award in 2017 for her work on Netflix's The Crown. She won BAFTA, IFTA and WIFTA awards in 2018 for her work on the Three Girls miniseries.

She was the editor of Kenneth Branagh's 2018 film, All Is True. She was also editor for Branagh's 2021 film Belfast and his 2022 film Death on the Nile. For her work on Belfast, she was nominated for the BAFTA Award for Best Editing.

Filmography

Film

References

External links
 

Irish film editors
Irish women editors
21st-century Irish women
Alumni of Dublin Institute of Technology
BAFTA winners (people)
Living people
Year of birth missing (living people)